The following is a list of notable deaths in August 2017.

Entries for each day are listed alphabetically by surname. A typical entry lists information in the following sequence:
 Name, age, country of citizenship at birth, subsequent country of citizenship (if applicable), what subject was noted for, cause of death (if known), and reference.

August 2017

1
Ana-Maria Avram, 55, Romanian composer.
Sir Patrick Bateson, 79, English biologist, Provost of King's College, Cambridge (1987–2003).
Pushpa Mittra Bhargava, 89, Indian scientist, writer, and administrator.
Sir John Blelloch, 86, British civil servant, Permanent Secretary at the Northern Ireland Office (1988–1990).
Jeffrey Brotman, 74, American businessman, co-founder of Costco, heart failure.
Hans Fahsl, 75, German Olympic athlete.
Ian Graham, 93, British Mayanist.
Daniel James III, 71, American Lieutenant General, Director of the Air National Guard (2002-2006), heart failure.
Jaroslav Konečný, 72, Czechoslovak Olympic handball player (1972).
Alfie Lorenzo, 78, Filipino talent manager, heart failure.
Mariann Mayberry, 52, American actress (War of the Worlds), ovarian cancer.
Goldy McJohn, 72, Canadian keyboardist (Steppenwolf), heart attack.
Harunur Rashid Khan Monno, 84, Bangladeshi industrialist and politician, MP (1991–2003).
Bud Moore, 75, American racing driver (NASCAR).
Phil Muntz, 83, Canadian-born American aerospace engineer, physicist and Canadian football player.
Shōgorō Nishimura, 87, Japanese film director (Moeru Tairiku, Cruel Female Love Suicide, Apartment Wife: Affair In the Afternoon).
John Reaves, 67, American football player (Cincinnati Bengals, Philadelphia Eagles).
Diana Reynell, 83, English grotto designer.
Patrick Thomas, 85, Australian conductor.
Eric Zumbrunnen, 52, American film editor (Being John Malkovich, Her, Adaptation), cancer.

2
Tore Bøgh, 93, Norwegian diplomat, Ambassador to Yugoslavia (1980–1988) and Portugal (1988–1992).
David Caldwell, 85, Scottish footballer (Aberdeen F.C.).
Wanda Chotomska, 87, Polish children's author and screenwriter (Jacek i Agatka).
Tony Cohen, 60, Australian record producer (Nick Cave and the Bad Seeds).
Sir Alcon Copisarow, 97, British civil servant and management consultant.
Santosh Mohan Dev, 83, Indian politician, Ministry of Heavy Industries and Public Enterprises (2005–2009).
Robin Eady, 76, British dermatologist.
Alexander Gerasimenko, 71, Belarusian diplomat and politician, Mayor of Minsk (1991–1995).
Marshall Goldman, 87, American economist.
Sir John Graham, 82, New Zealand rugby union player (Canterbury, national team), sports administrator, and educator (Auckland Grammar School), cancer.
Duke Harris, 75, Canadian ice hockey player (Minnesota North Stars), complications from heart surgery.
David Ince, 96, British WWII RAF officer.
Judith Jones, 93, American book editor (Alfred A. Knopf) and publishing proponent (Anne Frank: The Diary of a Young Girl, Mastering the Art of French Cooking).
Leonard H. Lavin, 97, American businessman (Alberto-Culver) and racehorse owner.
Daniel Licht, 60, American soundtrack composer (Dexter, Thinner, Dishonored) and musician, sarcoma.
Jim Marrs, 73, American journalist, author, and conspiracy theorist, heart attack.
Rosemary Reed Miller, 78, American historian and boutique owner.
Ara Parseghian, 94, American football player and coach (University of Notre Dame).
Paul Renton, 54, New Zealand rugby union player (Manawatu, Mid Canterbury, Hawke's Bay), suicide.
Erich Schwandt, 82, Canadian musician and musicologist.
Shen Daren, 89, Chinese politician, Communist Party Chief of Ningxia (1986–1989) and Jiangsu (1989–1993).
Ely Tacchella, 81, Swiss football player (national team).
Graham Wiltshire, 86, English cricket player and coach (Gloucestershire).

3
Émile Belcourt, 91, Canadian operatic tenor.
Giovanni Benedetti, 100, Italian Roman Catholic prelate, Bishop of Foligno (1976–1992).
David James Bowen, 91, Welsh academic (University of Wales, Aberystwyth).
Claudia Pinza Bozzolla, 92, Argentine-born American opera singer and teacher.
Kevin Carton, 83, Australian Olympic hockey player.
Ladislav Čisárik, 63, Slovak heraldic artist, co-designed the national coat of arms and flag.
Jacques Daoust, 69, Canadian politician, Québec Minister for Transport (2016) and MNA (2014–2016).
Bonaventura Duda, 93, Croatian Franciscan friar and theologian.
Richard Dudman, 99, American journalist (St. Louis Post-Dispatch, Denver Post, Bangor Daily News).
Hans Fahsl, 75, German Olympic athlete.
Ty Hardin, 87, American actor (Bronco, Berserk!, Battle of the Bulge).
Robert Hardy, 91, British actor (All Creatures Great and Small, Harry Potter, Sense and Sensibility).
Julia Harrison, 97, American politician and activist, cancer.
Garry Hart, Baron Hart of Chilton, 77, British life peer, member of the House of Lords (since 2004), cancer.
Dickie Hemric, 83, American basketball player (Boston Celtics, Wake Forest Demon Deacons).
Souad Al-Humaidhi, 78, Kuwaiti businesswoman, banker and real estate developer (Bank Audi, Commercial Bank of Kuwait, Solidere).
Eberhard von Koerber, 79, German manager, Chairman of World Organization of the Scout Movement (2003–2006) and Co-President of Club of Rome (2007–2012).
Laurent Lavigne, 81, Canadian politician, MNA (1976–1985).
Dejan Miladinović, 68, Serbian opera director.
Ángel Nieto, 70, Spanish motorcycle racer, winner of 13 Grand Prix World Championships, cerebral edema.
Iwao Ōtani, 98, Japanese film recording engineer.
Alan Peckolick, 76, American graphic designer (Revlon).
Ioan Popa, 64, Romanian Olympic fencer (1976, 1980).
Çetin Şahiner, 82, Turkish Olympic hurdler.
Chandra Sathe, 69, Indian cricket umpire.

4
Émile Baffert, 92, French racing cyclist.
Richard Bonney, 70, English historian and priest.
Laurie Brokenshire, 64, English Royal Navy officer and magician, brain cancer.
Erling Brøndum, 87, Danish journalist and politician, Minister of Defence (1973–1975).
Gene Brown, 91, American professor emeritus.
Raffaele Calabro, 77, Italian Roman Catholic prelate, Bishop of Andria (1988–2016).
Bruno Canfora, 92, Italian jazz composer, conductor and music arranger.
John Frame, 86, Canadian Anglican prelate, Bishop of Yukon⋅(1968–1980).
Chuck Hay, 87, Scottish curler, world champion (1967).
Angel G. Jordan, 86, Spanish-born American computer engineer.
Walter Levin, 92, German-born American violinist (LaSalle Quartet).
Luiz Melodia, 66, Brazilian actor, singer and songwriter, bone marrow cancer.
Reijo Puiras, 65, Canadian Olympic cross-country skier (1976).
Waldemar Schreckenberger, 87, German lawyer, jurist and politician, Minister of Justice (1981–1982) and Chancellery Chief of Staff (1982–1984).
Jessy Serrata, 63, American Tejano musician, kidney cancer.
Bogusław Wolniewicz, 89, Polish philosopher, professor and journalist (Radio Maryja).

5
Dame Helen Alexander, 60, British businesswoman, President of CBI (2009–2011), Chairwoman of PLA (2010–2015) and Chancellor of University of Southampton (since 2011), cancer.
Irina Berezhna, 36, Ukrainian politician, People's Deputy (2007–2014), traffic collision.
Ralph Biasi, 69, Brazilian politician, Mayor of Americana (1973–1977) and Minister for Science and Technology (1988–1989).
Lee Blakeley, 45, British opera and theatre director, heart attack.
Patricia Bridges, 95, Australian golfer.
Joe Cilia, 79, Maltese footballer (Valletta, Rabat Ajax, national team).
Martin Clark, 78, British historian of Italy, complications of Parkinson's disease.
Theodore Frankel, 88, American mathematician.
Egbert Haverkamp-Begemann, 94, Dutch-born American art historian.
Doug Insole, 91, English cricketer (Essex, England).
Wojciech Krzemiński, 84, Polish astronomer.
Roy Lunn, 92, American automotive engineer, stroke.
Hélène Martini, 92, French nightclub owner (Folies Bergères).
Christian Millau, 88, French food critic and author.
Richard O'Brien, 60, American television director (Fox News), complications from injuries sustained in traffic collision.
William S. Patout III, 84, American sugar executive.
Marcelino Perelló Valls, 73, Mexican activist (Mexico 68) and journalist (Excélsior).
Doug Shave, 70, Australian politician, member of the Western Australian Legislative Assembly (1989–2001).
George Bundy Smith, 80, American lawyer and judge, New York Supreme Court (1980–1992) and Court of Appeals (1992–2006).
Dionigi Tettamanzi, 83, Italian Roman Catholic cardinal, Archbishop of Milan (2002–2011), Genoa (1995–2002), and Ancona-Osimo (1989–1991).
Mark White, 77, American politician, Governor of Texas (1983–1987), Attorney General of Texas (1979–1983), heart attack.
Ernst Zündel, 78, German Holocaust denial publisher and pamphleteer (Samisdat Publishers).

6
Wolfgang H. Berger, 79, German-American oceanographer, geologist and micropaleontologist, emeritus professor at Scripps Institution of Oceanography.
Arthur Boyars, 92, British poet and musicologist.
Nicole Bricq, 70, French politician, Deputy (1997–2002), Senator (2004–2012, since 2014), Minister for Ecology, Sustainable Development and Energy (2012) and Foreign Trade (2012–2014), fall.
Betty Cuthbert, 79, Australian Hall of Fame athlete, fourfold Olympic champion (1956 (3), 1964), complications from multiple sclerosis.
Darren Daulton, 55, American baseball player (Philadelphia Phillies, Florida Marlins), World Series champion (1997), glioblastoma.
Hugh Heclo, 74, American political scientist.
Eugene Hlywa, 91, Ukrainian-born Australian psychologist.
Tim Homer, 43, New Zealand radio host.
Hinrich Lehmann-Grube, 84, German politician, Mayor of Leipzig (1990–1998), cancer.
Li Shengjiao, 82, Chinese diplomat, international jurist, educator and bilingual author.
Dick Locher, 88, American cartoonist (Dick Tracy), Pulitzer Prize winner (1983), Parkinson's disease.
David Maslanka, 73, American composer, colon cancer.
Daniel McKinnon, 90, American ice hockey player, Olympic silver medalist (1956).
Kevin McNamara, 82, British politician, MP for Hull North (1966–1974, 1983–2005) and Hull Central (1974–1983), pancreatic cancer.
Jack Rabinovitch, 87, Canadian real estate developer (Trizec Properties) and philanthropist, founder of the Scotiabank Giller Prize, fall.
Martin Roth, 62, German museologist, Director of the Victoria and Albert Museum (2011–2016).

7
Vytautas Astrauskas, 86, Lithuanian politician, President of the Presidium of the Supreme Soviet (1987–1990).
Don Baylor, 68, American baseball player (Baltimore Orioles, California Angels) and manager (Colorado Rockies), World Series champion (1987), multiple myeloma.
Chantek, 39, American hybrid orangutan who learned American Sign Language, heart disease.
Tor Røste Fossen, 77, Norwegian football player and manager (Rosenborg, Start, national team).
David Heimbach, 78, American surgeon.
Michael A. Lehman, 74, American politician, member of the Wisconsin Assembly (1989-2005).
Haruo Nakajima, 88, Japanese actor (Godzilla, Destroy All Monsters, Seven Samurai), pneumonia.
Sigmund Sobolewski, 94, Polish activist and Holocaust survivor, pneumonia.
Ralf Stemmann, 59, German-born American record producer and musician.
Patsy Ticer, 82, American politician, member of the Virginia Senate (1996–2011) and Mayor of Alexandria, Virginia (1991–1996), complications from a fall.
Kjellfred Weum, 77, Norwegian Olympic hurdler (1968).

8
Merv Agars, 92, Australian footballer (West Adelaide).
Arleta, 72, Greek singer, songwriter and book illustrator, stroke.
Rosemary Balmford, 83, Australian jurist.
Jean-Marie Berthier, 77, French poet, traffic collision.
Blanche Blackwell, 104, Jamaican socialite.
Julio César Bonino, 70, Uruguayan Roman Catholic prelate, Bishop of Tacuarembó (since 1990).
Eugene Burger, 78, American magician, cancer.
Glen Campbell, 81, American singer ("Rhinestone Cowboy", "By the Time I Get to Phoenix") and actor (True Grit), Grammy winner (1967, 2015), Alzheimer's disease.
Barbara Cook, 89, American singer and actress (The Music Man, Sondheim on Sondheim, Candide), respiratory failure.
Roger Counsil, 82, American gymnastics coach.
Max De Pree, 92, American businessman (Herman Miller), cancer and kidney failure.
Mike Deakin, 83, English footballer (Crystal Palace).
Hashem El Madani, 88–89, Lebanese photographer.
Emerson H. Fly, 82, American academic administrator, president of the University of Tennessee system (2001–2002), Parkinson's disease.
Arlene Gottfried, 66, American photographer, breast cancer.
Pierre Jaubert, 88, French record producer.
Ken Kaiser, 72, American baseball umpire, American League (1977–1999), complications from diabetes.
Ke Jun, 100, Chinese metallurgist.
Dick MacPherson, 86, American football coach (UMass, Syracuse, New England Patriots).
Cathleen Synge Morawetz, 94, Canadian mathematician.
Pēteris Plakidis, 70, Latvian composer and pianist.
Rius, 83, Mexican intellectual, political cartoonist and writer.
Ken Roberts, 79, British rugby league player (Swinton, Halifax, Great Britain).
Gonzague Saint Bris, 69, French novelist and biographer, Prix Interallié winner (2002), traffic collision.
Janet Seidel, 62, Australian cabaret singer, jazz vocalist, pianist and music teacher (Sydney Girls High School), Bell Awards winner (2006), ovarian cancer.
Gyan Singh Sohanpal, 92, Indian politician, Speaker of the West Bengal Legislative Assembly (2011).
Zeny Zabala, 80, Filipina actress (Sampaguita Pictures).
Mattlan Zackhras, 47, Marshallese politician and diplomat, member of the Nitijela (since 2004), Minister in Assistance to the President of Marshall Islands (since 2016).
Jorge Zorreguieta, 89, Argentine businessman and politician, Secretary of Agriculture, Livestock and Fisheries (1979–1981), leukemia.

9
Thomas A. Bird, 98, British WWII army officer and architect.
Jerry Campbell, 73, American football player (Ottawa Rough Riders, Calgary Stampeders), heart attack.
Romdhan Chatta, 77, Tunisian actor.
Ted Corbett, 82, English cricket writer (The Hindu).
Aubyn Curtiss, 92, American politician, member of the Montana House of Representatives (1977–1983; 1995–2002).
Patricio Echegaray, 70, Argentine politician, General Secretary of the Communist Party of Argentina (since 1986).
Patricia Giles, 88, Australian women's rights activist and politician, Senator for Western Australia (1981–1993), dementia.
Khine Htoo, 61, Burmese singer, pancreatic cancer.
Sanwar Lal Jat, 62, Indian politician, MP for Ajmer (since 2014), Minister of State for Water Resources, River Development & Ganga Rejuvenation (2014–2016), kidney failure.
Beethoven Javier, 70, Uruguayan football player and coach.
Johno Johnson, 87, Australian politician, President of the New South Wales Legislative Council (1978–1991).
Tony Keady, 53, Irish hurler (Killimordaly), complications from a heart attack.
Kerk Kim Hock, 61, Malaysian politician, MP (1986–2004), complications from deep vein thrombosis.
Malle Leis, 77, Estonian painter.
Al McCandless, 90, American politician, member of the U.S. House of Representatives from California's 37th and 44th congressional districts (1983–1995).
Raymond Damase Ngollo, 81, Congolese general.
Marcel Rué, 90, Monegasque Olympic sports shooter.
Robert Joseph Shaheen, 80, American Maronite clergyman, Eparch of Our Lady of Lebanon of Los Angeles (2000–2013).
Janie Shores, 85, American judge, Alabama Supreme Court (1974–1999), stroke.
Marián Varga, 70, Slovak organist and composer.
Danny Walton, 70, American baseball player (Milwaukee Brewers, Minnesota Twins).
Wang Xiuyun, 72, Singaporean actress.
Peter Weibel, 66, German Olympic racing cyclist (1972, 1976), cancer.
Mac Wilson, 103, Australian football player.

10
Jim Chandler, 76, American author.
Miroslav Ćurčić, 55, Serbian footballer (FK Vojvodina).
Katalin Csőke, 60, Hungarian Olympic discus thrower (1980).
Sam Dryden, 67, American food security expert, multiple systems atrophy.
Alois Eisenträger, 90, German footballer.
Don Gross, 86, American baseball player (Cincinnati Redlegs, Pittsburgh Pirates).
Luciano Guerzoni, 82, Italian politician, President of Emilia-Romagna region (1987–1990) and Senator (1992–2006).
Chris Hesketh, 73, English rugby league player (Wigan, Salford, national team).
Inamul Haque Khan, 90, Pakistani air marshal and politician, Minister of Interior (1978), Housing and Works (1978–1982, 1997–1999), and Water and Power (1980–1981).
Barry Myers, 78, American baseball college coach.
Vijay Nambisan, 54, Indian poet.
Sheila Natusch, 91, New Zealand naturalist, writer and illustrator.
Jim Nevin, 86, Australian Olympic racing cyclist (1952, 1956).
Patrick O'Connell, 83, Irish actor.
Sitaram Panchal, 54, Indian actor (Peepli Live, Lajja, Slumdog Millionaire), kidney and lung cancer.
Zygfryd Perlicki, 85, Polish Olympic sailor (1972), (Copernicus).
Ruth Pfau, 87, German-Pakistani nun and physician.
T. Jack Thompson, 74, British historian, cancer.

11
Abdulhussain Abdulredha, 78, Kuwaiti actor and writer.
Luiz Vicente Bernetti, 83, Italian-born Brazilian Roman Catholic prelate, Bishop of Apucarana (2005–2009).
Susan Brown, 79, British mathematician.
Segun Bucknor, 71, Nigerian musician, complications from multiple strokes.
Neil Chayet, 78, American lawyer and radio personality (WBZ), cancer.
Richard Gordon, 95, English physician and author (Doctor).
Yisrael Kristal, 113, Polish-Israeli supercentenarian and Holocaust survivor, world's oldest living man.
Jerry Janes, 82, Canadian football player (BC Lions).
Kent Lee, 94, American naval officer, Vice Admiral of the U.S. Navy.
Terele Pávez, 78, Spanish actress (Witching & Bitching, La Celestina, The Bar), Goya winner (2013), stroke.
Eugenio Polgovsky, 40, Mexican filmmaker.
Daisy Sweeney, 97, Canadian music teacher.
Kim Wall, 30, Swedish journalist (The New York Times, The Guardian, Time), homicide.

12
Nils G. Åsling, 89, Swedish entrepreneur, politician and farmer, Minister of Industry (1976–1978, 1979–1982).
Christopher Buxton, 88, English property developer.
Paul Casanova, 75, Cuban baseball player (Washington Senators, Atlanta Braves), cardiorespiratory complications.
Zdravko Hebel, 74, Croatian water polo player, Olympic champion (1968) and President of Croatian Olympic Committee (2000–2002).
Fatima Ahmed Ibrahim, 84, Sudanese writer and feminist.
Leo Kieffer, 86, American politician, member of the Maine Senate (1992–2000).
Bryan Murray, 74, Canadian ice hockey coach and general manager (Ottawa Senators, Washington Capitals, Detroit Red Wings), colon cancer.
Don Pettie, 90, Canadian Olympic sprinter.
Tudor Postelnicu, 85, Romanian politician, police officer and criminal, head of the Securitate (1978–1987), Minister of Internal Affairs (1987–1989).
John F. Russo, 84, American politician, member of the New Jersey Senate (1974–1992), President of the Senate (1986–1990), esophageal cancer.

13
Aung Shwe, 99, Burmese politician and army general.
Harry Beitzel, 90, Australian football umpire and broadcaster.
Joseph Bologna, 82, American actor (Blame It on Rio, My Favorite Year, The Big Bus), pancreatic cancer.
Shobha Sen, 93, Indian actress, natural causes. 
Reinhard Breymayer, 73, German philologist.
Savino Bernardo Maria Cazzaro Bertollo, 92, Italian-Chilean Roman Catholic prelate, Archbishop of Puerto Montt (1988–2001).
Stephen Keynes, 89, English banker.
Sylvester Li Jian-tang, 91, Chinese Roman Catholic prelate, Archbishop of Taiyuan (1994–2013).
Nick Mantis, 81, American basketball player (Minneapolis Lakers, St. Louis Hawks, Chicago Zephyrs).
Basilio Martín Patino, 86, Spanish film and documentary director (Canciones para después de una guerra, Caudillo).
Victor Pemberton, 85, British writer and television producer (Doctor Who, Fraggle Rock, The Adventures of Black Beauty).
Paul Xie Ting-zhe, 86, Chinese Roman Catholic prelate, Bishop of Xinjiang-Urumqi.

14
Leonard E. Baum, 85, American mathematician.
Andrzej Blumenfeld, 66, Polish actor (The Pianist, Delivery Man, The Witcher).
Frank Broyles, 92, American college football coach and athletic director (Arkansas Razorbacks), Alzheimer's disease.
Franklin Cleckley, 77, American state judge, member of the Supreme Court of West Virginia (1994–1996).
Mohammad Ali Falahatinejad, 41, Iranian weightlifter, World champion (2003), kidney infection.
Abdelkrim Ghallab, 97, Moroccan politician and writer.
Winston Green, 58, Jamaican dentist and politician, MP (since 2016).
Joi Harris, 40, American motorcycle racer and stuntwoman (Deadpool 2), motorcycle stunt accident.
Allan Hay, 88, Canadian chemist.
Benard Ighner, 72, American musician, record producer (Who Is This Bitch, Anyway?) and songwriter, lung cancer.
Robert Millman, 77, American physician.
Nubar Ozanyan, 61, Turkish Armenian militant, shot.
J. S. Parker, 72, New Zealand painter, lung cancer.
Lateef Raji, 54, Nigerian politician.
Thomas L. Saaty, 91, American mathematician.
Neil Smyth, 89, Australian cricketer.
Robert B. Stobaugh, 89, American economics writer.
Stephen Wooldridge, 39, Australian Olympic cyclist (2004) and world champion (2002, 2003, 2004, 2006), suicide.
Bhakti Yadav, 91, Indian doctor.

15
Abdirahman Barre, 79, Somali politician, Deputy Prime Minister (1987–1991), Minister of Finance (1987–1991) and Minister of Foreign Affairs (1989–1990).
Gunnar Birkerts, 92, Latvian-born American architect, heart failure.
Liam Devaney, 82, Irish hurler (Tipperary GAA).
Pavel Egorov, 69, Russian pianist, cancer.
Vern Ehlers, 83, American politician, member of the U.S. House of Representatives from Michigan's 3rd congressional district (1993–2011).
Tui Flower, 91, New Zealand food writer.
Brian Gibson, 80, Australian politician, Senator for Tasmania (1993–2002), cancer.
Roger Hendrix, 74, American biologist.
Eberhard Jäckel, 88, German historian.
Kasatka, 41, American orca, euthanized.
Joe McGurn, 52, Scottish footballer (St Johnstone, Alloa Athletic, Stenhousemuir), cancer.
Mark Merlis, 67, American writer (An Arrow's Flight), pneumonia.
Paul Oliver, 90, British architecture and blues historian.
Diane Pearson, 85, British book editor (Transworld Publishers) and author.
Shanmugasundaram, 77, Indian actor (Karagattakaran).
Zhu Jian'er, 94, Chinese composer.

16
Peter Bird, 82, British computer scientist.
Jennifer Daniel, 81, Welsh actress (The Reptile, Kiss of the Vampire).
Vera Glagoleva, 61, Russian actress, People's Artist (2011), cancer.
Kira Golovko, 98, Russian actress, People's Artist (1957).
Tom Hawkins, 80, American basketball player (Notre Dame Fighting Irish, Los Angeles Lakers, Cincinnati Royals).
Mike Hennessey, 89, English music journalist and jazz pianist.
Ross Johnson, 77, American politician, member of the California State Assembly (1978–1995) and Senate (1995–2004), cancer.
William Jones, 88, Canadian Olympic sport shooter.
Bill Lasseter, 76, Canadian football player (BC Lions).
Wayne Lotter, 51, South African elephant conservationist and anti-poaching activist, shot.
Peter Milward, 91, British Jesuit priest and literary scholar.
Patrick O'Flaherty, 78, Canadian historian and author.
John Ogston, 78, Scottish footballer (Aberdeen).
Nelia Penman, 101, British barrister and political activist.
Roger Pinto, 57, Bolivian politician, plane crash.
Jon Shepodd, 89, American actor (Lassie, What Ever Happened to Baby Jane?).
David Somerset, 11th Duke of Beaufort, 89, British peer, member of the House of Lords (1984–1999).
Vicente Sota, 93, Chilean politician, Deputy (1965–1969, 1990–1998) and President of the Chamber of Deputies (1994–1995).
John E. Tapscott, 87, American politician, member of the Iowa House of Representatives (1967–1971) and Senate (1971–1973).
Michael Twomey, 83, Irish actor.
Bill Weick, 85, American wrestler and coach.
Lester Williams, 58, American football player (New England Patriots).

17
John Books, 76, Australian politician, member of the New South Wales Legislative Assembly for Parramatta (1988–1991).
Peter Byrne, 81, Canadian Olympic sailor.
Francis X. DiLorenzo, 75, American Roman Catholic prelate, Bishop of Honolulu (1994–2004) and Richmond (since 2004).
Joseph Grimberg, 84, Singaporean lawyer and judge.
Jim Hargrove, 72, American football player (Minnesota Vikings, St. Louis Cardinals), complications from Alzheimer's disease.
Sonny Landham, 76, American actor (Predator, 48 Hrs., Lock Up), heart failure.
M. T. Liggett, 86, American folk sculptor.
Parker MacDonald, 84, Canadian ice hockey player (Detroit Red Wings, Minnesota North Stars).
John Nderu, 71, Kenyan Olympic boxer.
Mohamed Refaat El-Saeed, 84, Egyptian politician and scholar.
Sirkka Selja, 97, Finnish poet.
Paulo Silvino, 78, Brazilian actor and humorist (A Praça É Nossa, Zorra Total), stomach cancer.
Fadwa Souleimane, 47, Syrian actress and activist, cancer.
Halwa Vasu, 54, Indian comic actor (Amaidhi Padai), liver failure.

18
Pertti Alaja, 65, Finnish footballer (Malmö), President of Football Association of Finland (since 2012), cancer.
Alfonso Azpiri, 70, Spanish videogame cover and comic artist.
Sonny Burgess, 88, American rockabilly guitarist, singer and songwriter.
Duncan Bush, 71, Welsh author.
Dave Creighton, 87, Canadian ice hockey player (Boston Bruins, New York Rangers, Toronto Maple Leafs).
Arthur J. Finkelstein, 72, American political consultant, lung cancer.
Sir Bruce Forsyth, 89, English television presenter (The Generation Game, Play Your Cards Right, Strictly Come Dancing) and entertainer, bronchial pneumonia.
Vicente Iturat, 88, Spanish racing cyclist.
William Kretschmar, 84, American lawyer and politician, member of the North Dakota House of Representatives (1973–1998, 2000–2017).
Zoe Laskari, 72, Greek actress and beauty pageant winner (Miss Hellas 1959).
Mirosława Litmanowicz, 89, Polish chess player.
Liz MacKean, 52, British broadcast journalist (Newsnight), stroke.
Venero Mangano, 95, American bookmaker, racketeer and extortionist (Genovese crime family).
Roger D. McKellips, 94, American politician, member of the South Dakota Senate (1977–1978, 1981–1994).
Lívia Mossóczy, 81, Hungarian table tennis player, World champion (1957).
Tadayoshi Nagashima, 66, Japanese politician, member of the House of Representatives (since 2005), mayor of Yamakoshi, Niigata (2000–2005).
Duncan Russell, 59, English football manager (Mansfield Town), cancer.
Don Shepherd, 90, Welsh cricketer (Glamorgan).
Sergio Zaniboni, 80, Italian comics artist (Diabolik).

19
Brian Aldiss, 92, British science fiction writer (Helliconia, Greybeard, Supertoys Last All Summer Long) and editor.
Charles R. Bentley, 87, American glaciologist.
Len Bracko, 73, Canadian politician, member of the Legislative Assembly of Alberta (1993–1997).
Mario Roberto Cassari, 73, Italian Roman Catholic prelate and diplomat, Apostolic Nuncio to Malta (2015–2016) and South Africa (2012–2015).
Pyotr Deynekin, 79, Russian military officer, commander of the Russian Air Force (1992–1998), Hero of the Russian Federation (1997).
Salif Diallo, 60, Burkinabé politician, President of the National Assembly (since 2015).
Gérard Férey, 76, French chemist.
Janusz Głowacki, 78, Polish-American playwright, screenwriter and essayist.
Karl Otto Götz, 103, German artist, filmmaker, and writer.
Dick Gregory, 84, American comedian and civil rights activist, heart failure.
Gary O'Callaghan, 83, Australian radio broadcaster (2UE, 2SM).
Jorge Rodriguez-Chomat, 72, Cuban-born American politician and judge, member of the Florida House of Representatives (1994–1998) and the Eleventh Judicial Circuit Court (2011–2017).
Alan Sayers, 101, New Zealand athlete, journalist and writer, British Empire Games bronze medalist (1938).
Ed Sharockman, 77, American football player (Minnesota Vikings), heart failure.
Shane Sieg, 34, American racing driver (NASCAR).
Concha Valdés Miranda, 89, Cuban composer.
Bea Wain, 100, American singer, heart failure.

20
Karin Bang, 88, Norwegian writer.
Velichko Cholakov, 35, Bulgarian weightlifter, European champion (2004), Olympic bronze medalist (2004).
Radoš Čubrić, 83, Serbian Yugoslav Olympic cyclist (1972).
Bernard Dunstan, 97, British artist.
Harry Haureliuk, 70, Australian bodybuilder.
Margot Hielscher, 97, German singer and film actress.
Wilhelm Killmayer, 89, German composer, conductor and lecturer.
Fredell Lack, 95, American violinist.
Jerzy Leśniak, 60, Polish journalist and historian, heart attack.
Jerry Lewis, 91, American comedian (Martin and Lewis), actor (The Nutty Professor) and humanitarian (The Jerry Lewis MDA Labor Day Telethon), cardiomyopathy.
Sir Colin Meads, 81, New Zealand rugby union player, coach and manager (King Country, national team, Cavaliers), pancreatic cancer.
Nati Mistral, 88, Spanish actress and singer (Currito of the Cross, Cabaret, Mis tres amores).
Gary West, 57, Australian Olympic cyclist and cycling coach, motor neurone disease.
Gordon Williams, 83, Scottish writer (The Siege of Trencher's Farm).

21
Arturo Corcuera, 81, Peruvian poet.
Dianne de Las Casas, 47, Filipino-born American author, house fire.
Josip Despot, 64, Croatian Olympic rower.
Réjean Ducharme, 76, Canadian novelist and playwright.
Greg Evers, 62, American politician, member of the Florida House of Representatives (2001–2010) and Senate (2010–2016), traffic collision.
Roberto Gottardi, 90, Italian architect.
Bill Green, 66, English football player (Hartlepool United, Chesterfield) and manager (Scunthorpe United).
Helmut Hofmann, 91, German Olympic boxer (1952).
Thomas Meehan, 88, American playwright (Annie, The Producers, Hairspray), Tony winner (1977), cancer.
Don Nichols, 92, American motorsport team owner.
Rikard Olsvik, 87, Norwegian politician, MP (1981–1993).
Helmut Piirimäe, 86, Estonian historian.
P. V. R. K. Prasad, 77, Indian civil servant.
Ron Previte, 73, American gangster.
Felo Ramírez, 94, Cuban-American sports broadcaster (Miami Marlins), complications from a fall.
Abdur Razzak, 75, Bangladeshi actor (Boro Bhalo Lok Chhilo), five-time winner of National Film Award for Best Actor.
Bajram Rexhepi, 63, Kosovar politician, Prime Minister (2002–2004), stroke.
Seija Simola, 72, Finnish singer.
Boris Spremo, 81, Yugoslav-born Canadian photojournalist (Toronto Star, The Globe and Mail), complications from multiple myeloma.
Dame Margaret Turner-Warwick, 92, British physician and thoracic specialist, first female president of the Royal College of Physicians.
Perch Zeytuntsyan, 79, Egyptian-born Armenian playwright, Minister of Culture (1990–1991).

22
John Abercrombie, 72, American jazz guitarist, heart failure.
Nestor Assogba, 88, Beninese Roman Catholic prelate, Archbishop of Parakou (1976–1999) and Cotonou (1999–2005).
Alain Berbérian, 63, French film director and writer.
Feyyaz Berker, 91, Turkish executive (Tekfen Construction and Installation).
Thomas W. Blackwell, 58, American politician, member of the Pennsylvania House of Representatives (2005–2008).
Jim Blount, 82, American newspaper editor (Hamilton Journal-News) and historian.
Tim Bruxner, 94, Australian politician, member of the New South Wales Legislative Assembly for Tenterfield (1962–1981).
Attilio Cantoni, 86, Italian Olympic rower.
Tony deBrum, 72, Marshallese politician, Foreign Minister (1979–1987, 2008–2009, 2014–2016).
Gertrude Goodrich, 102, American painter and writer.
Michael J. C. Gordon, 69, British computer scientist.
Carol Hanson, 83, American politician, member of the Florida House of Representatives (1982–1994), Mayor of Boca Raton, Florida (1995–2001).
Rishang Keishing, 96, Indian politician, Chief Minister of Manipur (1980–1981, 1994–1997), multiple organ failure.
*Matthew Kia Yen-wen, 92, Taiwanese Roman Catholic prelate, Archbishop of Taipei (1978–1989), Bishop of Kiayi (1970–1974) and Hwalien (1974–1978).
Aloys Kontarsky, 86, German pianist, complications from a stroke.
Mario Milita, 94, Italian voice actor.
Pedro Pedrossian, 89, Brazilian politician, Governor of Mato Grosso (1966–1971) and Mato Grosso do Sul (1980–1983, 1991–1995).
Tim Poston, 72, English mathematician.
Tom Pritchard, 100, New Zealand cricketer (Wellington, Warwickshire, Kent).
Fejat Sejdić, 76, Serbian brass band leader.
Jim Whelan, 68, American politician, Mayor of Atlantic City (1990–2002), member of the New Jersey General Assembly (2006–2008) and Senate (since 2008), heart attack.

23
Eduardo Angeloz, 85, Argentine politician, Governor of Córdoba (1983–1995) and Senator (1973–1976, 1995–2001).
Tjitze Baarda, 85, Dutch theologian.
Yossi Beinart, 61, Israeli economist, CEO of the Tel Aviv Stock Exchange (since 2014).
Binh Pho, 61, Vietnamese artist in wood.
Kevin Curran, 88, Zimbabwean cricketer.
Michael Dauncey, 97, British Army brigadier.
Viola Harris, 91, American actress (Deconstructing Harry, The Other Guys, Sex and the City 2).
Engelbert Jarek, 82, Polish footballer (Odra Opole).
George A. Keyworth II, 77, American physicist, prostate cancer.
Joe Klein, 75, American baseball executive (Texas Rangers, Cleveland Indians, Detroit Tigers), complications from heart surgery.
Ronan Leprohon, 78, French Breton nationalist politician.
Izak Parviz Nazarian, 88, Iranian-American businessman (Omninet).
Sean O'Callaghan, 63, Irish IRA member, informant and writer.
John Petty, 82, English Anglican priest.
Fiona Richardson, 50, Australian politician, member of the Victorian Legislative Assembly for Northcote (since 2006), breast cancer.
Jack Rosenthal, 82, Israeli-born American journalist.
Jeannie Rousseau, 98, French Allied spy.
Ramananda Sengupta, 101, Indian cinematographer.
Francis Thompson, 92, British economic and social historian.
Susan Vreeland, 71, American author, complications from heart surgery.

24
Cecil Andrus, 85, American politician, U.S. Secretary of the Interior (1977–1981), Governor of Idaho (1971–1977, 1987–1995), lung cancer.
Mark Asay, 53, American white supremacist and spree killer, execution by lethal injection.
Michael Dougall Bell, 73, Canadian diplomat, Ambassador to Israel (1990–1992, 1999–2003), liver cancer.
Alan Boswell, 74, English footballer (Shrewsbury Town, Bolton Wanderers).
J. D. Disalvatore, 51, American LGBT film producer (Shelter), breast cancer.
Thomas Docking, 63, American politician, Lieutenant Governor of Kansas (1983–1987), cancer.
Doug Everingham, 94, Australian politician and minister, Minister for Health and Aged Care (1972–1975) and MP (1967–1975, 1977–1984).
Pete Kuykendall, 79, American bluegrass musician.
Kai Linnilä, 75, Finnish writer and editor.
Larry Marshall, 75, Jamaican reggae singer, complications from Alzheimer's disease.
Mary Montgomery, 60, American Olympic swimmer (1972).
Michael Quinn, 71, British chef (The Ritz).
Houssenaly Zahid Raza, Malaysian honorary consul, shot.
Charlie Robertson, 83, American politician, mayor of York, Pennsylvania (1994–2002).
Jay Thomas, 69, American actor (Cheers, Murphy Brown, Love & War) and radio talk show host, Emmy winner (1990, 1991), cancer.
Amelyn Veloso, 43, Filipino journalist and broadcaster (CNN Philippines), breast cancer.

25
Martin Biles, 98, American Olympic javelin thrower (1948).
Enzo Dara, 78, Italian opera singer.
Sharry Konopski, 49, American model and actress, pneumonia.
Ed McGaa, 81, American air force pilot and author, complications of cancer.
Drew Morphett, 69, Australian sports broadcaster (ABC).
Margaret Moser, 63, American journalist, colon cancer.
Rich Piana, 45, American bodybuilder and Internet personality, complications from a heart attack and brain trauma.

26
Dagobert Banzio, 60, Ivorian politician.
Dave Bumpstead, 81, English football player (Millwall, Bristol Rovers) and manager (Chelmsford City).
Christie Davies, 75, British sociologist.
Harry Dinnel, 76, American basketball player and coach (Anaheim Amigos).
Dámaso González, 68, Spanish bullfighter, pancreatic cancer.
Tobe Hooper, 74, American film director (The Texas Chain Saw Massacre, Poltergeist, Salem's Lot).
Muzaffer İzgü, 83, Turkish children's writer and teacher, cancer.
Howard Kaminsky, 77, American publisher (Random House), heart attack.
Tomasz Konina, 45, Polish theatre and opera director and stage designer.
Léonard Lévesque, 82, Canadian politician, MNA (1976–1985).
Grzegorz Miecugow, 61, Polish newscaster (Wiadomości, Fakty TVN) and columnist (Szkło kontaktowe), cancer.
Josef Musil, 85, Czech volleyball player, Olympic silver (1964) and bronze (1968) medalist.
Wilson das Neves, 81, Brazilian percussionist and singer, cancer.
Bernard Pomerance, 76, American playwright (The Elephant Man), cancer.
Lacey Putney, 89, American politician, member of the Virginia House of Delegates (1962–2014).
Alan Root, 80, British-born Kenyan filmmaker, glioblastoma.
Peter Ryalls, 79, British cyclist.
Larry Sherman, 94, American actor (Law & Order) and publicist (Donald Trump, New Jersey Generals).
Rick Sowieta, 63, Belgian-born Canadian football player, cancer.
Horacio White, 90, Argentine Olympic swimmer (1948).
Adam Wójcik, 47, Polish basketball player (Śląsk Wrocław), leukemia.

27
Martin Azonhiho, Beninese politician, Minister for Defence (2006).
Ahmed Khan, 90, Indian Olympic footballer (1948, 1952).
Khalid Kharal, 78, Pakistani politician.
Maurice Rigobert Marie-Sainte, 89, Martinican Roman Catholic prelate, Archbishop of Saint-Pierre and Fort-de-France (1972–2004).
James Dickson Phillips Jr., 94, American federal judge, U.S. Court of Appeals for the Fourth Circuit (1978–1994).
José Maria Pires, 98, Brazilian Roman Catholic prelate, Bishop of Araçuaí (1957–1965) and Archbishop of Paraíba (1965–1995), pneumonia.
Yitzhak Pundak, 104, Polish-born Israeli military officer and diplomat.
Syd Silverman, 85, American publisher (Variety).
Helli Stehle, 109, Swiss actress and radio presenter.
Chris Winn, 90, English cricketer (Sussex, Oxford University).
Ebrahim Yazdi, 85, Iranian politician and diplomat, Minister of Foreign Affairs (1979), Deputy Prime Minister (1979), pancreatic cancer.
M. A. Zaher, 85, Bangladeshi geologist.

28
Melissa Bell, 53, English singer (Soul II Soul).
Bobby Boyd, 79, American football player (Baltimore Colts).
Bruce Collingwood, 64, Canadian politician.
Muhammad Dandamayev, 88, Russian Babylon historian.
Mireille Darc, 79, French actress (Week End, The Tall Blond Man with One Black Shoe, Icy Breasts) and model.
Willie Duggan, 67, Irish rugby union player (Blackrock College, national team, British and Irish Lions).
Tore Frängsmyr, 79, Swedish historian.
Jack Geddes, 92, Canadian curler.
Tsutomu Hata, 82, Japanese politician, Prime Minister (1994).
Jud Heathcote, 90, American Hall of Fame basketball coach (Michigan State Spartans, Montana Grizzlies), national champion (1979).
Gulzar Khan, Pakistani politician, member of the National Assembly (since 2013).
Narendra Kumar, 77, Indian physicist.
Kirti Kumari, 50, Indian politician, MLA (since 2013), swine flu.
Angélica Mendoza de Ascarza, 87, Peruvian human rights activist.
Dean Mercer, 47, Australian ironman, four-time national champion (1989, 1995–1997), heart attack.
David Torrence, 31, Peruvian-American Olympic athlete (2016).

29
Adnan Abu Amjad, 39–40, Syrian military officer.
Senarath Attanayake, 51, Sri Lankan politician.
A. H. M. Azwer, 80, Sri Lankan politician, MP (2010–2015).
Mahmud Kanti Bello, 72, Nigerian politician, Senator (2003–2011).
Evdokia Bobyleva, 98, Russian teacher.
Janine Charrat, 93, French ballerina and dance choreographer.
Kurt Dahlmann, 99, German pilot and journalist.
Larry Elgart, 95, American jazz bandleader.
Carlos Gereda y de Borbón, 70, Spanish aristocrat.
Harold Hurley, 87, Canadian ice hockey player, Olympic silver medalist (1960).
Otto Kandler, 96, German botanist and microbiologist.
Léon Konan Koffi, 88, Ivorian politician.
Dmitri Kogan, 38, Russian violinist, lymphoma.
Soledad Saieh, 45, Chilean businesswoman, film producer, and cultural manager, pulmonary edema.
Sir David Tang, 63, Hong Kong businessman (Shanghai Tang), liver cancer.

30
Elmer Acevedo, 68, Salvadoran Olympic footballer (1968), (C.D. FAS).
Sid Ahmed Ould Bneijara, 70, Mauritanian politician, Prime Minister (1980–1981).
Marjorie Boulton, 93, British author and poet.
Alan Cassell, 85, Australian actor (Special Squad).
Richard Sui On Chang, 75, American Episcopal prelate, bishop of Hawaii (1997–2006).
Jennie Darlington, 93, Canadian polar explorer, heart illness.
Peter Diamondstone, 82, American lawyer and politician.
Hato Hasbún, 71, Salvadoran politician, heart attack.
Louise Hay, 90, American motivational author (You Can Heal Your Life).
Tessa Holyoake, 54, Scottish haematologist, cancer.
Abdul Jabbar, 79, Bangladeshi singer.
Efrain Loza, 78, Mexican Olympic footballer.
Alan MacDonald, 61, British production designer (The Queen, The Best Exotic Marigold Hotel, Philomena).
Károly Makk, 91, Hungarian film director and screenwriter.
Rollie Massimino, 82, American Hall of Fame basketball coach (Villanova Wildcats, UNLV Runnin' Rebels, Cleveland State Vikings), national champion (1985).
Tim Mickelson, 68, American rower, Olympic silver medalist (1972), amyotrophic lateral sclerosis.
Sam Pivnik, 90, Polish Jewish Holocaust survivor, author and memoirist.
Skip Prokop, 73, Canadian drummer (Lighthouse, The Paupers) and disc jockey (CFNY-FM).
L. N. Shastri, 46, Indian playback singer, intestinal cancer.
Sumiteru Taniguchi, 88, Japanese anti-nuclear weapons activist, cancer.

31
Richard Anderson, 91, American actor (The Six Million Dollar Man, The Bionic Woman, Forbidden Planet).
William Beik, 76, American historian.
John Bourchier, 87, Australian politician, member of the House of Representatives for Bendigo (1972–1983).
Christopher Byworth, 78, British Anglican priest.
Janne Carlsson, 80, Swedish actor (Repmånad, Göta kanal eller Vem drog ur proppen?) and drummer (Hansson & Karlsson), liver cancer.
Mike Cockerill, 56, Australian soccer journalist, cancer.
Sir Edward du Cann, 93, British politician, MP for Taunton (1956–1987).
Marco Ferraro, 62, Canadian curler, brain cancer.
Egon Günther, 90, German film director and writer (Lotte in Weimar, Morenga, Her Third).
Dirk Hafemeister, 59, German equestrian, Olympic champion (1988), heart attack.
William Ives, 73, British executive.
Ann Jellicoe, 90, British dramatist.
Bernie Katz, 49, British night club manager (Groucho Club).
Norbert Kückelmann, 87, German film director (Man Under Suspicion).
Barry Liebmann, 63, American comedy writer (Mad), liver cancer.
Tormod MacGill-Eain, 80, Scottish comedian and singer.
Novella Nelson, 77, American actress and singer (A Perfect Murder, Birth, Antwone Fisher).
Jan Romare, 81, Swedish diplomat and comics artist.
Tamara Tchinarova, 98, French ballet dancer.

References

2017-08
 08